João Dermival Brigatti (born 14 March 1964) is a Brazilian professional football manager and former player who played as a goalkeeper.

Career
Born in Campinas, São Paulo, Brigatti was a Ponte Preta youth graduate. However, he never established himself as a regular starter at the club, and had subsequent spells at Bandeirante, America-SP, Rio Branco-SP, Desportiva, Remo, Santa Cruz and Caldense. He retired in 1996, aged 32, with Santa.

Shortly after retiring, Brigatti started working as a goalkeeping coach at his first team Ponte Preta. In 2011, he joined Theodore Whitmore's staff at the Jamaica national team, again as a goalkeeping coach. After working in the same role at Chunnam Dragons FC, he was appointed Mazola Júnior's assistant at Paysandu for the 2014 season.

After following Mazola at Bragantino, Botafogo-SP and CRB, Brigatti returned to Ponte on 7 December 2016, as an assistant manager. He also acted as interim manager on three occasions for the Macaca before leaving in 2018.

On 3 September 2018, Brigatti returned to Paysandu, now being named first team manager. He was sacked the following 18 March, and was appointed in charge of Sampaio Corrêa on 27 June.

Brigatti returned to Ponte on 20 February 2020, replacing sacked Gilson Kleina. Sacked on 2 October, he rejoined Paysandu for a third spell late in the month.

Honours

Player
Remo
Campeonato Paraense: 1994

References

External links

1964 births
Living people
Sportspeople from Campinas
Brazilian footballers
Association football goalkeepers
Associação Atlética Ponte Preta players
America Football Club (RJ) players
Rio Branco Esporte Clube players
Desportiva Ferroviária players
Clube do Remo players
Santa Cruz Futebol Clube players
Associação Atlética Caldense players
Brazilian football managers
Campeonato Brasileiro Série B managers
Campeonato Brasileiro Série C managers
Associação Atlética Ponte Preta managers
Paysandu Sport Club managers
Sampaio Corrêa Futebol Clube managers
Santa Cruz Futebol Clube managers
Oeste Futebol Clube managers
América Futebol Clube (RN) managers
Manaus Futebol Clube managers
Pan American Games silver medalists for Brazil
Medalists at the 1983 Pan American Games
Footballers at the 1983 Pan American Games
Pan American Games medalists in football